Jayanagar is a residential suburb of Mysore city, Karnataka state, India. It is 4 km from the Mysore city bus stand. Noted landmarks in Jayanagar including Sankethi hostel, Srirama Mandira, ISKCON temple, Prashanth PG and Bedara Kannappa temple.

Transportation
The nearest railway station is Ashokapuram, 2 kilometer away. City buses No. 53, 60, 61, 63 connect this suburb to the city bus stand.

Gallery

See also
 Akshaya Bhandar
 Kuvempunagar
 Ballal Circle

References

Suburbs of Mysore
Mysore South